The Federal Ministry of Health is one of the Federal Ministries of Nigeria concerned with the formulation and implementation of policies related to health. It is headed by two Ministers appointed by the President, assisted by a Permanent Secretary, who is a career civil servant. The current Minister of Health is Osagie Ehanire. The current Minister of State for Health is Olorunimbe Mamora. The Federal Ministry Of Health has over 800 workers consisting of closely 430 women and 370 men.[5]

Departments
The Ministry has several departments specializing in different aspects of health care. The Family Health department is concerned with creating awareness on reproductive, maternal and neonatal and child health, ensuring sound nutrition including infant and young child feeding, and care of the elderly and adolescents.
The department of Public Health coordinates formulation, implementation and evaluation of public health policies and guidelines. It undertakes health promotion, surveillance, prevention and control of diseases.

Functions of the department of Planning Research And Statistics include developing plans and budgets and monitoring their implementation, serving as Secretariat to the National Council on Health, conducting health research in collaboration with other departments and agencies, institutions and parastatals, conducting operational research and data collection, and performing various coordination functions.

Federal Ministry of Health (Nigeria) – Nigeria's Teaching hospitals, Orthopedic Hospitals Federal Medical Centres and National Eye Centers. The department processes appointment of chief medical directors and medical directors, supervises oral health research, develops policies on nursing, coordinates training programmes for nurses and monitors the midwifery service scheme in collaboration with NPHCDA.

The department of Food and Drugs Services formulates national policies, guidelines and strategies on food and drugs, and ensures ethical delivery of pharmaceutical services nationwide. The department sponsors the National Institute for Pharmaceutical Research and Development and the National Agency for Food and Drug Administration and Control, and acts as regulator through the Pharmacists Council of Nigeria, the Institute of Chartered Chemists of Nigeria and the Institute of Public Analyst of Nigeria.

The Nigeria Centre for Disease Control is a federal agency under the Ministry. The agency was established in 2011 with the assistance of the US Centers for Disease Control. furthermore,There's Health System Strengthening under federal ministry of health.

mandate of this division is to Plan for human resource for health development.

Functions & Objectives 

 Development of Plans (Rolling, Medium and Perspective) and Preparation of Budgets.
 Monitoring and Evaluation of Programmes, Projects and Plans Implementation.
 Serve as Secretariat to the National Council on Health.
 Conduct research into the sectors over which the Ministry has jurisdiction, in collaboration with other departments and agencies, institutions and parastatals.
 Conduct research into the internal organizational, operational and management modalities of the Ministry.
 Routine collection and processing of Data and Statistics relating to the Ministry and the Health Sector.
 Liaison with relevant bodies outside the Ministry.
 Coordinating, tracking and assessing MDG projects and programmes.
 Planning and coordination of Human Resources for Health development.
 International Health & Resource Mobilization.
 Implementation of World Bank/African Development Bank Health Systems Development Project.
 Coordination of National Health Management Information System.
 Serves as Secretariat of the National Health Research Ethics Committee.

Past and Present Ministers 

 Osagie Ehanire  (November 2019 to date)

See also
 Nigerian Civil Service
 Federal Ministries of Nigeria
 Health care in Nigeria

References

Federal Ministries of Nigeria
Medical and health organizations based in Nigeria
Nigeria